Khalil Khamis Salem (born 15 July 1992) is an Emirati professional footballer who plays as a midfielder for Emirati club Khor Fakkan.

References

External links
 

Emirati footballers
1992 births
Living people
Al-Wasl F.C. players
Fujairah FC players
Sharjah FC players
Khor Fakkan Sports Club players
UAE First Division League players
UAE Pro League players
Association football midfielders